Leskovdol is a mountainous village in Bulgaria situated in Golema mountain, part of the Balkan mountain range. It is located 45 kilometers north from Sofia and is part of the Svoge municipality. According to the 2011 census 114 people live in the settlement. Several places of interest are located nearby including the Seven Altars monastery, Izdremets peak and a section of the Kom–Emine long-distance footpath.

Etymology 
One of the theories is that the name of the village comes from the specific stones - liska - which could only be found in this area. This local stone was used as a foundation material for the local houses. The other theory is that Leskov comes from the Bulgarian word leska which means hazel tree.  The Bulgarian word dol  is translated in English as small valley. There are two ways of writing the village's name - Leskov dol or Leskovdol, although nowadays many people have adopted the merged version. Also on most of the maps and in official documents the name is written Leskovdol.

History 
It is believed that the village was founded somewhere between the years 1000 and 1300. The legend about the founding of the nearby monastery states that 7 brothers from Bessarabia settled in the mountains around the monastery and brought their families with them. One of the brothers settled in the lands of Leskovdol with his family and thus founded the village. This is just a legend but so far no evidence about the village's history have been found.

Berilova vodenitsa fortress

Historians confirm  that around the time of khan Krum on the northern hills above the village was located a fortress called Berilova vodenitsa. It is not known when exactly the fortress was built but it is known that it was renovated during the time of khan Krum for his march to conquer Serdica. Today on the meadows above Leskovdol, near Izdremets peak, one can see numerous scattered stones and rocks. An ancient Roman road from Vratsa to Serdica also passed nearby.

Ottoman Era 
The settlement was recorded as a village and as "Leskovdol" in the Ottoman Tahrir Defter number 370 from 1530. Moreover, in the Tahrir Defter number 151 from 1528 the village had Voynuk households under the Voynugan-ı Istabl-ı Amire military branch, which were Ottoman Christian Soldiers and were tax-exempt.

Wars between 1912 - 1918
20 people from Leskovdol perished in the wars that took place between 1912 and 1918. Their names are inscribed into a memorial plaque on one of the walls of the village church.

Area
The entire territory of Leskovdol - with all of its hamlets, forests and meadows - is a little over 26,2 square kilometers.

Nature and landscape 

The landscape is steep, typical for the Western Balkan mountain region. Leskovdol is situated from 700 to 1300 meters above sea level with Vratnitsa being the highest located hamlet at around 1300 meters. Dirt roads link Leskovdol with its neighbouring villages of Bukovets, Brezovdol, Redina (to the south), Želen (to the west) & Bov (to the north).
Wide mountain meadows make up to 39,8% of Leskovdol's territory and are mainly located in the higher parts of the village. 
Redinska is the main river which flows through the territory of the Leskovdol.

Flora & fauna
Forests cover a large percentage of the territory - around 55%. The conifers are mainly pines, spruces and firs, while the broad-leaved trees are well represented by multiple species including birches, fraxinus, tilias, fruit trees, hornbeams, walnut trees and beeches. 
The fauna in this region is typical for the Western Balkan mountain area. Wolves, wild rabbits, wild boars and hedgehogs inhabit the higher territories and the abandoned hamlets of the village which are not influenced by human activity. Domestic animals such as sheep, goats, pigs, chickens, cattle, cows and donkeys can be seen in the populated hamlets. A small part of Leskovdol's territory is under the protection of Natura 2000.

Division 
The village is divided into a number of hamlets, although the largest portion of the population is concentrated in the hamlets Selishte, Popov kladenets, Vratnitsa, Kokeleni babki, Svinove and Dobrolevo bardo. Lozeto bus stop on the bus route Svoge - Leskovdol marks the border between the territory of Leskovdol village and that of its neighbouring Redina village.

Education 

There is a single school named after Hristo Botev which shut down years ago. The local children go to the nearby town of Svoge to continue their education. The first village school was built on the banks of Redinska river but nowadays it doesn't exist.

Culture 
Nowadays the village has no functioning schools or chitalishta. Years ago Leskovdol had a folklore ensemble which performed national dances & songs from Bulgaria and from the Svoge region. The traditions in the village are close to the ones typical for the Svoge and Sofia regions.

Demographics 
At the beginning of the 20th century the population was at least 800 people and continued to enlarge. The migration towards the cities and the lowering fertility rate are the biggest problems that kept Leskovdol from growing. The unemployment is high due to the location of the village in a mountainous region. In summer a lot of people, mainly from Sofia, come to their villas for the typical summer break.

2011 census

According to the census held on the 01.02.2011 114 people declared to live in the village. Only 36 from them are officially retired.

Buildings
Houses, residential and non-residential buildings cover only around 5% of the entire village territory.
Most of the old houses in the village were built using adobe, rocks and wood. In the late 1960s people, mainly from Sofia, bought parcels in the village's hamlets and started building a second type of houses - villas and bungalows - which they used as a residence for their summer vacations. The villas are built with modern building materials and thus create a mixed look of the village with both typical and new houses forming the background. According to the 2001 census there were 128 local houses, 26 of which abandoned, and 619 other buildings, including villas & barns.

Economy 
Woodcutters can sometimes be seen in this area, especially during late summer. Agriculture and animal breeding are developed in the populated areas. 
There is a small bar and a shop next to the village hall. They are open every Tuesday, Thursday and Saturday.

Religion 

The entire population consists of Christians. There are three cemeteries - one nearby the village hall, one in Dabeto hamlet and another one in Selishte hamlet, where the village's church is also located. It has an outdoor semantron and was built during the period between the two world wars. It bears the name of Saint Elias. There are no serving priests since the 1970s.

Transport 
The road to Leskovdol diverts from the main road Sofia - Mezdra just before entering Svoge. It is 8 kilometers long and is mostly in good condition but only reaches the center of Kokeleni babki hamlet. Apart from that all others roads in the village are dirt roads. There are two charter buses to the village from Svoge every day - one in the morning and another in the afternoon. On Thursday there is an additional bus around noon.

Infrastructure 
Almost all of the houses have electricity and water supply. There are no telephone lines except a telephone post in the village hall. The postal code is 2268 although the post is delivered only to the village hall. The TV and radio tower is located in Popov kladenets hamlet. All three Bulgarian mobile operators have complete coverage in Leskovdol. The village hall shut down in the summer of 1999 due to the continuing diminution of the population.

Gallery

External links

References
Notes

Villages in Sofia Province